WMSK-FM (101.3 FM) is a radio station broadcasting a country music format.  Licensed to Sturgis, Kentucky, United States, the station serves the Evansville area.  The station is currently owned by Henson Media, Inc. and features programming from AP Radio and Jones Radio Network.

History
The station went on the air as WEZG on March 23, 2005.  On November 1, 2006, the station changed its call sign to the current WMSK-FM.

See also
List of radio stations in Kentucky

References

External links
Henson Media Corporate Website

MSK-FM
Union County, Kentucky